Schistogyna is a monotypic genus of South American sheet weavers containing the single species, Schistogyna arcana. It was first described by Alfred Frank Millidge in 1991, and has only been found in Chile and on the Juan Fernández Islands.

See also
 List of Linyphiidae species (Q–Z)

References

Linyphiidae
Monotypic Araneomorphae genera
Spiders of South America
Endemic fauna of Chile